Birmingham is a surname. Notable people with the surname include:

 Billy Birmingham (born 1953), Australian humorist
 Christian Birmingham, British illustrator
 Dan Birmingham, American boxing trainer
 DeCori Birmingham, American football player
 Edward de Birmingham (died bef. 1538), last member of the Birmingham family to hold the lordship of Birmingham
 George Birmingham (born 1954), Irish politician
 Gil Birmingham (born 1953), American actor
 Joe Birmingham (1884–1946), American baseball player
 John Birmingham (various)
 Kevin M. Birmingham, American Roman Catholic bishop
 Leo Birmingham (1893–1936), American politician
 Peter de Birmingham (12th century), founder of Birmingham as a regional economic centre
 Ray Birmingham (born 1955), American college baseball coach
 Richard Birmingham (died c. 1726), Justice of the Colonial Delaware Supreme Court
 Simon Birmingham (born 1974), Australian politician
 Stephen Birmingham (born 1932), American author
 Tom Birmingham (1949-2023), American politician

See also
De Birmingham family
Bermingham

English toponymic surnames